WRNO-FM (99.5 MHz) – branded News Talk 99.5 WRNO – is a commercial talk radio station licensed to serve New Orleans, Louisiana. Owned by iHeartMedia, Inc., the station serves the New Orleans metropolitan area. The WRNO-FM studios are located in Downtown New Orleans, while the station transmitter resides in the Bayou Bienvenue Central Wetland District near Chalmette.

Besides a standard analog transmission, WRNO-FM broadcasts over two HD Radio channels, and is available online via iHeartRadio. The WRNO-HD2 digital subchannel, which airs a classic hip-hop format, also simulcasts over a low-power FM translator.

History
On October 17, 1967, WRNO first signed on.  It was a stand-alone FM station, put on the air by Gulf South Broadcasters, with Joseph Costello III as the owner and general manager.  The station had its studios at 3230 Patterson Drive.  It was a network affiliate of the Mutual Broadcasting System and aired a progressive rock format.

Although its previous slogan was "We're the Rock of New Orleans," the station's call letters actually stand for "Westbank Radio New Orleans." The station operated a popular business selling rock t-shirts, records and other music related items called the WRNO "Rock Shop"  on the ground level of the studio. Since its inception in 1967, WRNO moved from progressive to album rock in the 1980s, and switched to Classic Rock in 1997. WRNO was also home to a popular shortwave radio service in the 1980s and 1990s called WRNO Worldwide, now owned by a Christian broadcaster.

In 1998, WRNO was acquired by Centennial Broadcasting.  Then in 2002, the station changed hands again, acquired by San Antonio-based Clear Channel Communications, the forerunner to today's owner, iHeartMedia, Inc.

On November 13, 2006, at 4 AM, after signing off with The Doors' "The End," WRNO flipped from rock music to a talk radio format as "The New 99.5FM.com."  They also played Whole Lotta Love the full version by Led Zeppelin for at least a week on 24 hour rotation before they signed off. As explained in the official mission statement posted at its website, "The station is committed to providing listeners with everything they need to know on the radio at 99.5 FM and on demand at thenew995fm.com." On the same day sister station KHEV became "The Rock of New Orleans," using it as the new slogan for that station's switch from Urban Gospel to Active Rock.

On April 1, 2008, WRNO changed its slogan to "Rush Radio," with all day repeats of The Rush Limbaugh Show.  It also played a tape loop of Rush's theme song, the instrumental from My City Was Gone by The Pretenders, during times when the show was not playing. The stunt was to celebrate WRNO's acquisition of the show from longtime affiliate WWL.  WRNO resumed its regular schedule on April 7, with Limbaugh heard from 11 a.m. to 2 p.m. weekdays plus a repeat on Saturdays.  The Limbaugh program had previously aired on WRNO Worldwide, which Limbaugh called "The EIB World Service" on the air (in joking reference to the BBC World Service).  The stations are no longer co-owned.

In September 2014 WRNO re-branded as "News Talk 99.5 WRNO."

Past Personalities
Notable station alumni include Bill Burkett, E.Alvin Davis, Joe Clark, Bobby Reno (later on WTIX-FM owned by Michael Costello, Joe's brother), Captain Humble, Doug Christian, and Russ Boney.

WRNO alumni also include former PD Michael Costello ("Michael In The Morning" and brother of late WRNO founder/owner Joseph Costello III), Jim White, DJ-turned-actor John Larroquette, Soxless Scott Seagraves, Jeff "JD The DJ" Douglas ("Rock 'n' Roll Flight To Midnight"), Tom Owens, Jimbo Roberts, Mitch McCracken, Johnny Tyler, "Weerd" Wayne Watkins, Mary London, Lyn Taylor and writer-producer Vance DeGeneres.  Steve Suter (later on Magic 101.9 WLMG) did the morning show with sidekick Kevin Carlile, as the "Morning Dudes."

Programming
The all-syndicated lineup on WRNO-FM includes America in The Morning and Walton & Johnson, followed by The Glenn Beck Radio Program (which is also replayed in the evening hours), The Rush Limbaugh Show middays; The Sean Hannity Show afternoons; programs hosted by Michael Berry and Buck Sexton in the evenings; and Coast to Coast AM overnights. Weekend programming includes The Jesus Christ Show and Handel on the Law.

WRNO-FM also airs regular updates from Fox News Radio.

References

External links
WRNO official website

The website of WRNO Worldwide Short Wave Radio, formerly co-owned with WRNO-FM
Weerd Wayne's online website of the music played on WRNO, during the Rock of New Orleans' heydey from 1965 thru 1989.

Radio stations in New Orleans
News and talk radio stations in the United States
Radio stations established in 1967
1967 establishments in Louisiana
IHeartMedia radio stations